"'Hookah" is a song recorded by Spanish singer-songwriter Bad Gyal. It was released on 19 July 2019 through Aftercluv Dance Lab and Interscope Records.

Composition
"Hookah" was written by Alba Farelo, Alejandro Ramírez Suárez, Bigram Zayas, Dwayne Chin-Quee and Ender Zambrano. It was composed in the key of C Major with a tempo of 104 beats per minute. Brendan Wetmore of Paper said, "'Hookah' has all the groove of [Bad Gyal's] previous songs, but with a boosted barrage of reggaeton drums and clicks to punctuate the blisteringly anthemic chorus."

Music video
The music video for "Hookah" was released along with the song and it was directed by Miguel Ángulo.

Charts

Certifications

References

2019 singles
2019 songs
Bad Gyal songs
Interscope Records singles
Music videos shot in Spain
Spanish-language songs
Universal Music Group singles